Sang is a tambon (subdistrict) of Seka District, in Bueng Kan Province, Thailand. In 2020 it had a total population of 8,883 people.

Administration

Central administration
The tambon is subdivided into 13 administrative villages (muban).

Local administration
The whole area of the subdistrict is covered by the subdistrict municipality (Thesaban Tambon) Sang (เทศบาลตำบลซาง).

References

External links
Thaitambon.com on Sang

Tambon of Bueng Kan province
Populated places in Bueng Kan province